The City of Lost Children is a 1995 science fantasy film directed by Marc Caro and Jean-Pierre Jeunet, written by Jeunet and Gilles Adrien, and starring Ron Perlman. An international co-production of companies from France, Germany, and Spain, the film is stylistically related to the previous and subsequent Jeunet films, Delicatessen and Amélie.

The musical score was composed by Angelo Badalamenti, with costumes designed by Jean-Paul Gaultier. It was entered into the 1995 Cannes Film Festival.

Plot
Krank (Daniel Emilfork), a highly intelligent but malicious being created by a vanished scientist, is unable to dream, which causes him to age prematurely. At his lair on an abandoned oil rig (which he shares with the scientist's other creations: six childish clones, a dwarf named Martha, and a brain in a vat named Irvin) he uses a dream-extracting machine to steal dreams from children. The children are kidnapped for him from a nearby port city by a cyborg cult called the Cyclops, who in exchange he supplies with mechanical eyes and ears. Among the kidnapped is Denree (Joseph Lucien), the adopted little brother of carnival strongman One (Ron Perlman).

After the carnival manager is stabbed by a mugger, One is hired by a criminal gang of orphans (run by a pair of conjoined twins called "the Octopus") to help them steal a safe. The theft is successful, but the safe is lost in the harbor when One is distracted by seeing Denree's kidnappers. He, together with one of the orphans, a little girl called Miette (Judith Vittet), follows the Cyclops and infiltrates their headquarters, but they are captured and sentenced to execution. Meanwhile, the Octopus orders circus performer Marcello (Jean-Claude Dreyfus) to return One to them. He uses his trained fleas, which inject a poison capsule that causes mindless aggression, to turn the Cyclops guards against each other. While Marcello is rescuing One, Miette falls into the harbor and sinks, seemingly drowned, but an amnesiac diver living beneath the harbor rescues her.

Miette leaves the diver's lair to find One and Marcello both drowning their sorrows in a bar. Upon seeing Miette alive the remorseful Marcello lets One leave with her. However the Octopus confronts them on the pier, and uses Marcello's stolen fleas to turn One against Miette. A spectacular chain of events triggered by one of Miette's tears leads to a ship crashing into the pier before One can throttle her. Marcello arrives and sets the fleas on the Octopus, allowing One and Miette to escape to continue searching for Denree.

Back at Krank's oil rig, Irvin tricks one of the clones into releasing a plea for help in the form of a bottled dream telling the story of what is going on on the oil rig. It reaches One, Miette, and the diver, and the latter remembers that he was the scientist who made them, and that the oil rig was his laboratory before Krank and Martha attacked him and pushed him off it to take it for themselves, leaving him for dead in the water. They all converge on the rig; the diver to destroy it and the duo to rescue Denree.

Miette is almost killed by Martha, but the diver harpoons her. She then finds Denree asleep in Krank's dream-extracting machine, and Irvin tells her that to release him she must use the machine to enter the dream herself. In the dream world, she meets Krank and makes a deal with him to replace the boy as the source of the dream; Krank fears a trap but plays along, believing himself to be in control. Miette then uses her imagination to control the dream and turn it into an infinite loop, destroying Krank's mind. One and Miette rescue all the children, while the now-deranged diver loads the rig with dynamite and straps himself to one of its legs. The diver regains his senses as everyone is rowing away and pleads with his remaining creations to come back to rescue him, but a seabird lands on the handle of the blasting machine, blowing up him and the rig.

Cast

 Ron Perlman as One
 Judith Vittet as Miette
 Daniel Emilfork as Krank
 Joseph Lucien as Denree
 Dominique Pinon as the diver and the clones
 Geneviève Brunet and Odile Mallet (née Odile Antoinette Brunet) as the Octopus 
 Jean-Claude Dreyfus as Marcello
 Jean-Louis Trintignant as Uncle Irvin (voice)
 Mireille Mossé as Martha
 Rufus as Peeler
 Serge Merlin as the chief of the Cyclops
 Marc Caro as Brother Ange-Joseph
 Ticky Holgado as an ex-acrobat
 Lorella Cravotta as The woman at her window

Reception
The film holds an 80% approval rating on Rotten Tomatoes based on 59 reviews, with an average rating of 7.4/10. The website's critical consensus reads, "Not all of its many intriguing ideas are developed, but The City of Lost Children is an engrossing, disturbing, profoundly memorable experience." It also holds a weighted average score of 73 on Metacritic, based on 16 critics, indicating "generally favorable reviews". Roger Ebert gave the film 3 stars out of a possible 4, writing that the film's design and visual effects deserved the highest possible praise but the story was sometimes confusing: "I would be lying if I said I understood the plot."

The film grossed $7 million in France, $1 million in Spain and $600,000 in Germany. In the United States and Canada it grossed $1.7 million. Including receipts from the UK (£401,523) and Australia, it has grossed over $11 million worldwide. Because its revenue was less than its $18 million budget, the film was a box-office bomb.

Interpretation
According to authors Jen Webb and Tony Schirato, the dual nature of capitalism constitutes a main source of tension in the film:

According to author Donna Wilkerson-Barker, these elusive aspects of humanity are presented within the film for various characters to identify with. For example, the relationship between One and Denrée represents, for Miette, a family of authenticity. Prepared to sacrifice her life in order to become a part of their family, Miette helps One to save Denrée from Krank's manipulative environment. In another example, Irvin the brain plays his part in overturning the same environment in order to liberate his "family" of clones. In the end, two boats filled with these two different families row towards their futures: In one boat, a technologically produced family of Irvin and the clones; In the other, a rationally envisioned family containing Miette, One, and the abducted children. This leaves the audience to question precisely what the future will hold for these two differing visions of humanity.

As The City of Lost Children "proceeds in full awareness that the past to which it is committed never really existed", the film has been classified as an example of the steampunk genre.

Video game

References

External links
 
 
 
 
 
 
 

1995 films
1995 fantasy films
1990s science fiction films
Cantonese-language films
Films about cloning
Films directed by Jean-Pierre Jeunet
Films directed by Marc Caro
Films scored by Angelo Badalamenti
Films shot in France
1990s French-language films
French dark fantasy films
French science fiction films
German fantasy films
German science fiction films
Science fantasy films
Mad scientist films
Magic realism films
Spanish dark fantasy films
Spanish science fiction films
Steampunk films
1990s French films
1990s German films
1990s Spanish films